Bragar is a village on the west side of the Isle of Lewis in the Outer Hebrides, Scotland,  from the island's only town, Stornoway. Bragar is within the parish of Barvas, and is situated on the A858 between Carloway and Barvas.

Residents are mainly Gaelic speaking, and many work as crofters.

The village's best-known landmark is a whalebone arch, made in 1921 from the jawbone of an  blue whale which was beached on the shore the year before. The arch is located at the Lakeview residence, the home of Murdo Morrison (1867 - 1950). Bragar also has a post office, a war memorial, and a school.

History
A ruined Iron Age broch, Dun  Bragar, stands in Loch an Dùin in South Bragar, 80 metres from the road and connected to the lochside by a causeway. In the mid-20th century local people took away many of its stones, and the structure is no longer safe.

The remains of a chapel, Teampall Eòin (the Temple of John the Baptist), built in the 15th century or earlier, lie inside a walled compound. This also contains a cemetery, now known as Cill Sgàire (Zechariah's cemetery) after Zechariah MacAulay who fell in a skirmish between the MacAulays of Uig and the Morrisons of Ness.

It is estimated that 2000 people are buried within the graveyard.

Notable people
Roderick Morison, the retained harper to Clan MacLeod at Dunvegan Castle, was born in Bragar in 1656. He wrote Òran Mòr MhicLeòid.

References

External links

West Side Historical Society - History of the Whalebone Arch
Canmore - Lewis, North Bragar site record
Canmore - Lewis, Bragar site record

Villages in the Isle of Lewis